John Robert Middleton was an American football player and coach. He served as the head football coach at his alma mater, the University of Idaho, from 1907 to 1908, compiling  a record of 6–3–3. Middleton began his college football playing career as a quarterback at Simpson College in Indianola, Iowa in 1901. He followed his coach at Simpson, John G. Griffith, to the University of Idaho, playing quarterback in the "Idaho Spread", a forerunner to the modern shotgun formation offense, from 1903 to 1905.

Head coaching record

Football

References

Year of birth missing
Year of death missing
American football quarterbacks
Idaho Vandals football coaches
Idaho Vandals football players
Simpson Storm football players